Rheem is a former unincorporated community now annexed to San Pablo in Contra Costa County, California.

References

Neighborhoods in Contra Costa County, California
San Pablo, California